Linwood, New Jersey most often refers to the city of Linwood in Atlantic County. Other places it may refer to include:

Linwood, Bergen County, New Jersey